"Don't Let Go of My Heart" is a song recorded by American country music group Southern Pacific. It was released in March 1987 as the third single from their 1986 album Killbilly Hill. The song reached No. 26 on the Billboard Hot Country Singles & Tracks chart.  The song was written by Kurt Howell and Harry Maslin.

Chart performance

References

1987 singles
1986 songs
Southern Pacific (band) songs
Song recordings produced by Jim Ed Norman
Warner Records singles